In category theory, a strict 2-category is a category with "morphisms between morphisms", that is, where each hom-set itself carries the structure of a category.   It can be formally defined as a category enriched over Cat (the category of categories and functors, with the monoidal structure given by product of categories).

The concept of 2-category was first introduced  by Charles Ehresmann in his work on enriched categories in 1965.  The more general concept of bicategory (or weak 2-category), where composition of morphisms is associative only up to a 2-isomorphism, was introduced in 1968 by Jean Bénabou.

Definition 
A 2-category C consists of:

The 0-cells, 1-cells, and 2-cells terminology is replaced by 0-morphisms, 1-morphisms, and 2-morphisms in some sources (see also Higher category theory).

The notion of 2-category differs from the more general notion of a bicategory in that composition of 1-cells (horizontal composition) is required to be strictly associative, whereas in a bicategory it needs only be associative up to a 2-isomorphism.  The axioms of a 2-category are consequences of their definition as Cat-enriched categories:

 Vertical composition is associative and unital, the units being the identity 2-cells .
 Horizontal composition is also (strictly) associative and unital, the units being the identity 2-cells  on the identity 1-cells .
 The interchange law holds; i.e. it is true that for composable 2-cells 

The interchange law follows from the fact that  is a functor between hom categories.  It can be drawn as a pasting diagram as follows:

Here the left-hand diagram denotes the vertical composition of horizontal composites, the right-hand diagram denotes the horizontal composition of vertical composites, and the diagram in the centre is the customary representation of both. The 2-cell are drawn with double arrows ⇒, the 1-cell with single arrows →, and the 0-cell with points.

Examples 
The category Ord (of preordered sets) is a 2-category since preordered sets can easily be interpreted as categories.

Category of small categories 

The objects (0-cells) are all small categories, and for all objects  and  the category  is a functor category. In this context, vertical composition is the composition of natural transformations.

Doctrines 
In mathematics, a doctrine is simply a 2-category which is heuristically regarded as a system of theories.  For example, algebraic theories, as invented by William Lawvere, is an example of a doctrine, as are multi-sorted theories, operads, categories, and toposes.

The distinction between a 2-category and a doctrine is really only heuristic: one does not typically consider a 2-category to be populated by theories as objects and models as morphisms.  It is this vocabulary that makes the theory of doctrines worth while.

For example, the 2-category Cat of categories, functors, and natural transformations is a doctrine.  One sees immediately that all presheaf categories are categories of models.

As another example, one may take the subcategory of Cat consisting only of categories with finite products as objects and product-preserving functors as 1-morphisms.  This is the doctrine of multi-sorted algebraic theories.  If one only wanted 1-sorted algebraic theories, one would restrict the objects to only those categories that are generated under products by a single object.

Doctrines were discovered by Jonathan Mock Beck.

See also 
 n-category

References

Footnotes
 Generalised algebraic models, by Claudia Centazzo.

External links

Higher category theory